"Case of the Ex" (sometimes subtitled "Whatcha Gonna Do") is a song by American singer Mýa. It was written and composed by Christopher "Tricky" Stewart and his songwriting partners Traci Hale and Thabiso "Tab" Nkhereanyne for Mýa's second studio album Fear of Flying (2000). The up-tempo pop and R&B track was inspired by a relationship Hale was going through at the time. It was released as the second single from the album, following "The Best of Me", on July 11, 2000.

The song received generally mixed reviews from contemporary music critics and was Mýa's breakthrough hit, both stateside and internationally. "Case of the Ex" became a top five hit on the US Billboard Hot 100 for the week of December 2, 2000, peaking and spending three consecutive weeks at number two. Internationally, the single topped the Australian ARIA Singles Chart for two consecutive weeks in March 2001 and peaked at number three in the United Kingdom.

The accompanying music video for the single was directed by Diane Martel. Mýa worked with choreographer Tina Landon, who later won an American Choreography Award for Best Hip Hop music video. The video drew comparisons to Janet Jackson's music video for "You Want This" (1994) and Mel Gibson's 1979 film Mad Max. In addition, the video was nominated for a Washington Area Music Award for Video of the Year, while the song itself won in the Urban Contemporary Recording category in 2001.

Background

"Case of the Ex" was composed by Christopher Stewart, Traci Hale, and Thabiso "Tab" Nkhereanyne in late 1999. Initially, Mýa was working at the Redzone Studios in Atlanta, Georgia, when she heard an early instrumental of the song through the walls from the room next door. She stepped out of her current session and was subsequently introduced to Stewart, who worked next to her. Originally a rap song, Stewart heavily rearranged the track to make it fit Mýa's persona.

Speaking of its creation, Stewart said: "We got together to write a song specifically for Mýa. We kicked around some subjects which Mýa could potentially sing. We wanted to create a lyric theme that would keep her young, yet would show that she was growing up." It was Hale who came up with the lyric idea, which was inspired by a relationship she was going through at the time and revolved around "a strong woman who won't tolerate her man returning to his ex-girlfriend." While Tab and Hale contributed most of the lyrics, Stewart wrote the music and played all of the tracks, with Hale singing on the original demo."

The initial demo also featured the percussive, keyboard hook which would become the song's musical trademark. "I followed an old philosophy, which is to try to catch the listener's attention," explained Stewart. "I wanted to make a statement with that hook, creating a special sound that people would react to and remember. It was like a loud horn blast, which was derived from a sampled sound, and then enhanced with my K-25 keyboard." Soon after completing the demo, Stewart played the song for Mýa, and she "immediately loved it." The following day, she recorded her vocals at Stewart's studio for the master version.

Critical reception
"Case of the Ex" garnered mixed to positive reviews. Billboard magazine compared the song to Destiny's Child's "Jumpin', Jumpin'", and added: "With its quick-programmed drum track [...] Mýa's 'Case of the Ex' is on the right track. Production-wise, the song used some computer tricks to play with Mýa's vocals. [It] is set to be a hot track on radio and in the clubs all summer long."  Jacqueline Springer of NME gave the song a favorable review and rated the single seven out of ten stars, writing: "No-good boyfriend anthem number four thousand eighty time, y'all [...] The stuttering arrangement of the original is cool and suits Mýa's brooding mood, but after a while it simply sits in the wind — there's no real build into a bassline leaving the track to run along a continuous pop/r&b vibe [...] Anyway, we all know what to do when ex-girlfriends re-emerge don't we? Round up your girls and give the wench a beat-down." Writing for Yahoo! Music UK, Gary Crossing described "Case of the Ex" as a smooth and sassy if a somewhat formulaic slice of R&B.<ref>{{cite web |url=http://uk.launch.yahoo.com/l_reviews_s/17680.html |title=Mya - Case Of The Ex (Whatcha Gonna Do)'|first=Gary |last=Crossing |publisher=Yahoo! Music UK |date=January 30, 2001 |access-date=October 9, 2018 |archive-url=https://web.archive.org/web/20040603200204/http://uk.launch.yahoo.com/l_reviews_s/17680.html |archive-date=June 3, 2004}}</ref>

Accolades
"Case of the Ex" was featured on The Village Voices Pazz & Jop end of the year critics list.

Chart performance

In the United States, "Case of the Ex" debuted at number 72 on Billboard Hot 100 in the week of August 19, 2000.[1] The following week, it leaped from 72 to 57 in the week of August 26, 2000. It continued to climb the Hot 100, ascending from 42 to 31 in its sixth week of September 23, 2000. The song reached its peak at number 2 in the week of December 2, 2000. From the weeks of December 2–16, 2000; it spent three consecutive weeks at number two. "Case of the Ex" spent 30 consecutive weeks on that chart. The song became Mýa's second non-consecutive Top Ten hit (solo) after 1998's "It's All About Me." It remains Mýa's second-biggest and second-highest-charting single on the chart to date (she topped the chart the following year when the "Lady Marmalade" remake featuring her, Lil' Kim, Christina Aguilera, and Pink climbed to number one). "Case of the Ex" became a Top Ten hit on Billboard Hot R&B/Hip-Hop Singles & Tracks chart in the week of December 9, 2000, peaking at number ten and spent 28 consecutive weeks on that chart. It was Mýa's fifth and final top-10 hit on that chart.

Globally, "Case of the Ex" became a Top 20 hit success. It debuted at number five on the Australian singles chart in the week of February 18, 2001. It topped the chart and spent two consecutive weeks at number one during the weeks of March 18–25, 2001. In total, the song spent twenty-three consecutive weeks altogether on the chart. It was certified platinum by Australian Record Industry Association for shipment of 70,000 units. In the Netherlands, the song debuted at number sixty-two during the week of October 7, 2000. It reached its peak of number eight in the week of November 4, 2000, and spent 18 consecutive weeks on the Dutch Top 100 Singles chart. "Case of the Ex" peaked at number seventeen in New Zealand during the week of January 28, 2001. It debuted and peaked at number three in the UK in the week of February 10, 2001, and spent thirteen consecutive weeks altogether on the chart.

Music video

Background
The music video for "Case of the Ex" was directed by Diane Martel. Mýa worked with choreographer Tina Landon, who won an American Choreography Award for Best Hip Hop Music Video for the video.

Legacy
British girl group IV Rox re-recorded "Case of the Ex" and released it as their debut single. Their version was featured on the group's debut EP Imperfections (2015). Impressed by their cover, Mýa has expressed her appreciation and tweeted, "Lovely job ladies~xoxo." With their version, the group auditioned for X Factor and received a standing ovation. Out magazine included "Case of the Ex" as one of their most empowering, memorable and influential all-girl dance routines list. Vh1 recognized "Case of the Ex" in their list of Best R&B Music Video Choreography of the 1990s and 2000s. Writing for Pitchfork, Marc Hogan suggested "Case of the Ex" as one of his choices for his 6 Millennium Era Hits That Top 40 Needs to Sample list, commenting, "A clear-voiced young singer with a strong sense of identity like Kehlani (or maybe Halsey in a pinch) could work wonders here." Billboard ranked "Case of the Ex" as one their 100 Greatest Songs of 2000 list. In September 2020, Spin'' magazine ranked "Case of the Ex" at number 19 on their "50 Greatest Songs of 2000" list.

Track listings

US CD single
 "Case of the Ex" (radio edit) – 3:35
 "Case of the Ex" (LP version) – 3:56
 "Case of the Ex" (instrumental) – 4:14

US 12-inch single
A1. "Case of the Ex (Whatcha Gonna Do)" (radio edit) – 3:52
A2. "Case of the Ex (Whatcha Gonna Do)" (LP version) – 3:56
B1. "Case of the Ex (Whatcha Gonna Do)" (instrumental) – 4:14
B2. "Case of the Ex (Whatcha Gonna Do)" (acappella) – 3:55

UK CD single
 "Case of the Ex" (radio edit) – 3:56
 "Case of the Ex" (Sovereign Remix) – 5:40
 "Ghetto Supastar (That Is What You Are)" (main version) – 4:26
 "Case of the Ex" (CD-ROM video)

UK 12-inch single
A1. "Case of the Ex" – 3:56
A2. "Case of the Ex" (O.M.O. 2-step mix) – 3:57
B1. "Case of the Ex" (Sovereign Remix) – 5:40

UK cassette single
 "Case of the Ex" – 3:56
 "Ghetto Supastar (That Is What You Are)" (main version) – 4:26

European CD single
 "Case of the Ex" (radio edit)
 "Case of the Ex" (O.M.O. 2-step mix)

Australian CD single
 "Case of the Ex" (radio edit)
 "Case of the Ex" (O.M.O. 2-step mix)
 "Take Me There" (soundtrack LP version)
 "Ghetto Supastar" (soundtrack LP version)

Credits and personnel

 Produced by Christopher "Tricky" Stewart
 Music by Christopher "Tricky" Stewart
 Lyrics by Traci Hale, Christopher "Tricky" Stewart

 Keyboards and programming by Christopher "Tricky" Stewart
 Recording engineer: Brian "B-Luv" Thomas
 Mix engineer: Kevin "KD" Davis

Charts

Weekly charts

Year-end charts

Certifications

Release history

Notes

See also
 List of number-one singles of 2001 (Australia)
 List of Top 25 singles for 2001 in Australia
 List of number-one urban singles of 2001 (Australia)
 List of UK R&B Singles Chart number ones of 2001
 List of UK top 10 singles in 2001
 List of Billboard Rhythmic number-one songs of the 2000s
 List of Billboard Hot 100 top 10 singles in 2000
 List of Billboard Hot 100 top 10 singles in 2001

References

External links
 MyaMya.com — official website
 

2000 singles
2000 songs
Dance-pop songs
Interscope Records singles
Music videos directed by Diane Martel
Mýa songs
Number-one singles in Australia
Song recordings produced by Tricky Stewart
Songs written by Traci Hale
Songs written by Tricky Stewart